Pine Mountain Wilderness is a protected wilderness area managed by the Prescott National Forest in the U.S. state of Arizona.  Pine Mountain is the high point of the Verde River Rim at 6,814 feet (2076 m) and provides an excellent viewing to the northeast of the Wild and Scenic Verde while surrounded by ponderosa pine and Douglas fir.

Sharing a boundary with the Tonto National Forest this area is the southernmost wilderness in Prescott National Forest and holds six hiking trails.

See also
 List of Arizona Wilderness Areas
 List of U.S. Wilderness Areas

References

External links
 Pine Mountain Trail – Arizona Highways

IUCN Category Ib
Wilderness areas of Arizona
Prescott National Forest
Protected areas of Yavapai County, Arizona
Protected areas established in 1972
1972 establishments in Arizona